Maxx may refer to:

 MAXX (brand), a public transport brand in Auckland, New Zealand
 Maxx (eurodance act), a German-based eurodance music project from the 1990s
 Maxxx (TV series), a Channel 4 sitcom/boyband satire created by O. T. Fagbenle
 The Maxx, a comic book and animated character
 ProSieben Maxx, German television channel
 T.J. Maxx, a department store chain in the US
 The Maxx (retail store), two defunct stores in Massachusetts operated by T.J. Maxx
 T.K. Maxx, a retail chain in Europe
 A line of radio-controlled vehicles from Traxxas, including the T-Maxx, SportMaxx, S-Maxx and E-Maxx
 Maxx Mann, a singer in the Trans-Siberian Orchestra
 Maxx or Max Muscle, the wrestler John Czawlytko
 Maxx Almere, a bus service in Almere, Netherlands
 Holden Captiva MaXX and Daewoo Winstorm MaXX, rebadging of the Opel Antara SUV

See also
 Max (disambiguation)
 Maxxx, a defunct general entertainment channel for men